The 2011–12 EWHL season was the eighth season of the Elite Women's Hockey League, a multi-national women's ice hockey league. Six teams participated in the league, and the EHV Sabres of Austria won the championship for the second time in a row and third time overall.

Regular season

Top scorers

External links
EWHL official website

Women
European Women's Hockey League seasons
Euro